John Michael Sciarra (born March 2, 1954) is a former professional American football safety in the National Football League (NFL) for the Philadelphia Eagles from 1978 to 1983. He also played receiver for the British Columbia Lions of the Canadian Football League (CFL). He played college football at UCLA. Off the field in 1977, John Sciarra established a career in qualified retirement plan administration, as a Third Party Administrator (TPA). He formed National Retirement Services, Inc. ("NRS") in 2001. He sold NRS in 2016 and is currently a consultant and conference speaker for a wide range of businesses and industries.

Early years
Sciarra was born in Los Angeles, CA the youngest of three children.  His parents, Edith and John J Sciarra, raised John and his two older sisters in Alhambra, CA.  John attended Bishop Amat Memorial High School in La Puente, California, where he was a National Honor Society student and starred in both football and baseball.  He was named the CIF Southern Section Player of the Year for football in 1971.  His maternal grandparents were Italian immigrants.

College years
After graduating from high school, Mr. Sciarra was heavily recruited by major college football and baseball programs, and was also drafted on the 3rd round by the Cleveland Indians to play professional baseball.  Ultimately, he chose to attend UCLA where he graduated cum laude in 1976 as one of four outstanding seniors to be honored for overall excellence and achievement, and was a member of the Student Legislative Council in 1974. Sciarra was quarterback for the Bruins 1972-1976 and named a consensus All-American in 1975.  He starred in the 1976 Rose Bowl in which UCLA upset favored Ohio State University, which was unbeaten ranked number one in the nation, by a score of 23–10.  Sciarra was named Most Valuable Player in the game. He ran for the most career yards by a quarterback in UCLA history. Sciarra was later inducted into the UCLA Athletic Hall of Fame in 1994, and National Football Foundation (College Football) Hall of Fame in 2014.

Professional career
After graduating from UCLA in 1976, Sciarra was the third pick of the Chicago Bears in the National Football League draft. He opted to sign a two-year contract with the BC Lions of the Canadian Football League on May 26, 1976. During the 1977 off season, Mr. Sciarra started his business career with Massachusetts Mutual Life Insurance Co. with a focus on selling life insurance within qualified pension plans.

Business
In 1978, Mr. Sciarra formed a company with two other colleagues, which included pension administration.  In 1988 Mr. Sciarra sold his stake to his partners and joined Dun & Bradstreet Pension Services (“DBPS”) as Director of West Coast Operations. In 1994, DBPS was sold to U.S. Pension Services (“USPS”).  Mr. Sciarra became a shareholder and held Director of Marketing & Sales and Operations Manager positions.  USPS was sold to First Data Investor Services Group (“FDISG”) in 1998, whereby Mr. Sciarra was named Vice President of Sales.  Shortly thereafter, FDISG was acquired by PFPC, a subsidiary of PNC Bank.  Mr. Sciarra was named Senior Vice President & COO of PFPC’s Retirement Services. With revenues of approximately $70 million and 650 employees, he was tasked with the responsibility to strategically develop a plan for long term growth and profitability.

Through his analysis it was determined that a certain segment of the retirement services business be divested.  Mr. Sciarra offered to acquire that segment of the business and it was accepted in June 2001.  With that business, Mr. Sciarra, and a long time co-worker, formed National Retirement Services, Inc (“NRS”).  Mr. Sciarra became the President & CEO of NRS.

Together, with the help of many outstanding co-workers, Mr. Sciarra positioned  NRS for success.  NRS became one of the largest privately owned Third Party Administration (TPA) firms in the country.  Mr. Sciarra led NRS in providing a full range of qualified retirement plan administration services, including plan documents, non-discrimination testing, trust accounting, 5500 filing, and plan-level administration.  NRS’s top priorities were to provide 100% customer satisfaction, enhancing its services and offering the best-qualified retirement plan solutions to its clients.  NRS services approximately 2,000 qualified retirement plans nationwide with offices in Huntington Beach, San Diego, and San Mateo, California and Charlotte, North Carolina.

After 16 years as President & CEO of NRS, and 40 years of service in the qualified retirement plan administration industry, Mr. Sciarra sold NRS to an industry leading pension administration and record keeping company, Ascensus,  in December, 2016.

Mr. Sciarra is currently a business consultant and conference speaker for a wide range of businesses and industries.

Professional football

BC Lions
John Sciarra signed a two-year contract with the BC Lions of the Canadian Football League on May 26, 1976. He was converted to Slotback early in the season and had 34 receptions for 563 yards.  He earned the CFL's Most Outstanding Rookie Award in 1976.   The next season, he tore is hamstring during the opening game of the 1977 regular season against Calgary.  He returned late in the season with 5 receptions for 53 yards.

Philadelphia Eagles
The Tampa Bay Buccaneers signed Sciarra, and the Philadelphia Eagles traded an undisclosed draft pick to Tampa Bay in exchange for Sciarra in 1978. While with the Eagles, he played for coach Dick Vermeil, who had been his college coach at UCLA. Sciarra played 6 years with the Eagles (1978-1983) as Defensive Back, Punt Returner, and was named Most Valuable Player for Special Teams in 1979 and 1980. He was the NFC Punt Return Leader in 1979, and was named Captain of the Special Teams in 1982 and 1983. The Eagles won the NFC Championship in 1980 and played in Super Bowl XV.

Awards and honors
On August 8, 1991, Sciarra was inducted into the Rose Bowl Hall of Fame. He was inducted into the UCLA Athletics Hall of Fame in 1994 and was inducted into the College Football Hall of Fame as a member of the Class of 2014.

Sciarra was the keynote speaker at UCLA's 2009 Sociology Department graduation ceremony, where graduates included Hall of Fame quarterback Troy Aikman, then-current quarterback Kevin Craft, and former linebacker Marcus Reece, who had come back to UCLA to finish his degree.

Sciarra served on Advisory Councils for John Hancock Financial Services, Retirement Division, Nationwide, Retirement Services and Massachusetts Mutual, Retirement Services.

Mick Jagger wore Sciarra's Eagles jersey at the Rolling Stones concert at JFK Stadium (Philadelphia, PA) on September 26, 1981.

Personal
John Sciarra married his wife Michele in 1977 and together they have three children.

References

1954 births
Living people
All-American college football players
American football quarterbacks
American football safeties
BC Lions players
Canadian Football League Rookie of the Year Award winners
College Football Hall of Fame inductees
Philadelphia Eagles players
UCLA Bruins football players
Players of American football from Los Angeles
Canadian football quarterbacks
Players of Canadian football from Los Angeles